The terms top, bottom, and switch are used to describe roles for the duration of a sexual act or they may more broadly denote a psychological, social, or sexual identity, or indicate one's usual preference. The terms top, bottom, and switch are also used in BDSM, with slightly different meanings. In BDSM, a top is the person doing something to someone else, and a bottom is the person receiving that act.  In both contexts, the terms top and bottom refer to active and passive roles, not to who is physically on top in a particular sexual act. The older term "versatile" is sometimes used instead of "switch."

Top

In BDSM, top can mean either a dominant partner in BDSM play (such as flogging, binding, being master, humiliating, and sexual play), or a partner who applies stimulation to another, and who may or may not be dominant.

Topping from the bottom is a related BDSM term, meaning a person simultaneously adopts the role of bottom and dom.

A service top is a person who applies sensation or control to a bottom, but does so at the bottom's explicit instructions.

Bottom

In BDSM, bottom can mean either a submissive partner in sexual play (such as in being flogged, tied, humiliated, or made to serve), or a partner who receives stimulation from another, and who may or may not be submissive.

A bottom in BDSM does not have to be the submissive; for example, a female dominant may command her submissive to penetrate her.

Switch
A switch is someone who participates in BDSM activities sometimes as a top and other times as a bottom or (in the case of dominance and submission) sometimes as a dominant and other times as a submissive. This is sometimes referred to as being versatile.

Dominant and submissive

Those who take the superior position in dominance and submission scenes and relationships are called dominants, doms or dommes (feminine), while those who take the subordinate position are called submissives or subs. A top filling the dominant role is not necessarily a dominant, and vice versa, and a bottom is not necessarily submissive. Similarly, many other labels exist for both dominants and submissives, such as Master/slave or Caregiver/little.

The main difference between a dominant and a top is that the dominant exhibits control within a power exchange dynamic, while a top exhibits control within a scene. A top may or may not be a dominant.

The main difference between a submissive and a bottom is that a submissive cedes power in a power exchange dynamic.  A bottom may or may not be a submissive, as power exchange does not have to be a component of their kinky play.

Many distinguish top/bottom from dominant/submissive by seeing top/bottom as an expression of physical power, while dominant/submissive is an expression of psychological power. In both types of relationships - top/bottom and dominant/submissive - consent, negotiations, and mutual respect and support for one another are keys to healthy dynamics.

Beginning in the 1970s, in some American contexts, people would identify their interests by wearing a set of keys on the side of their belt or a color-coded handkerchief in their rear pockets. This practice, called flagging, began in the gay male subculture.

Sadist and masochist

The terms sadism and masochism are the giving and receiving of emotional or mental pain.

See also

 List of sexual positions
 Master/slave (BDSM)
 Servitude (BDSM)

References

Further reading
 Dossie Easton, Janet W. Hardy. The New Topping Book. Greenery Press, 2003. .
 Person, Ethel S. / Terestman, Nettie / Myers, Wayne A. / Goldberg, Eugene L. / Salvadori, Carol: Gender differences in sexual behaviors and fantasies in a college population, 1989, erschienen in: Journal of Sex and Marital Therapy, Bd. 15, Nr. 3, 1989, P. 187–198
 Janus, Samuel S. / Janus, Cynthia L., 1993 The Janus Report on Sexual Behavior, Wiley, New York
 Charles Moser, in Journal of Social Work and Human Sexuality 1988, (7;1, P.43–56)

BDSM terminology

de:BDSM#Weitverbreitete Rollenmodelle